Heybat may refer to:
 Heybət, Azerbaijan
 Heybat-e Olya, Iran
 Heybat-e Sofla, Iran